Phu Luong is a mountain in Vietnam. With a topographic prominence of  it is the fourth most prominent peak in Indochina (comprising Vietnam, Laos, and Cambodia). Phu Luong is located within the Sơn La Province of Vietnam.

See also
 List of Southeast Asian mountains
 List of Ultras of Southeast Asia

References

External links 
 "Phu Luong, Vietnam" on Peakbagger

Mountains of Vietnam
Landforms of Sơn La province